Elusa ceneusalis is a species of moth of the family Noctuidae. It was described by Francis Walker in 1859 and is known from Sundaland, the Philippines, Sulawesi, Queensland, and the Bismarck Islands.

The forewings are darkish grey brown with a pale, straight submarginal line. The hindwings are plain brown.

References

Moths described in 1859
Hadeninae
Moths of Asia
Moths of Oceania